Scrophularia peregrina, the Mediterranean figwort, is a species of annual herb in the family Scrophulariaceae. They have a self-supporting growth form. Individuals can grow to 0.39 m.

Sources

References 

peregrina
Flora of Malta